Harold Brooke (1 August 1899 – 6 October 1986) was an Australian sailor. He competed in the Dragon event at the 1960 Summer Olympics.

References

External links
 

1899 births
1986 deaths
Australian male sailors (sport)
Olympic sailors of Australia
Sailors at the 1960 Summer Olympics – Dragon
Sportspeople from Melbourne